David Haig may refer to:

 David Haig, English actor
 David Haig (biologist), Australian biologist

See also
David Haigh (born 1977), British businessman
David Hague (born 1982), English footballer
David B. Haight (1906–2004), American leader in The Church of Jesus Christ of Latter-day Saints